CJK Compatibility Ideographs Supplement is a Unicode block containing Han characters used only for roundtrip compatibility mapping with planes 3, 4, 5, 6, 7, and 15 of CNS 11643-1992.

Block

History
The following Unicode-related documents record the purpose and process of defining specific characters in the CJK Compatibility Ideographs Supplement block:

See also 
CJK Unified Ideographs
CJK Compatibility Ideographs

References 

Unicode blocks